Bergolo is a comune (municipality) in the Province of Cuneo in the Italian region Piedmont, located about  southeast of Turin and about  northeast of Cuneo.

Bergolo borders the following municipalities: Cortemilia, Levice, Pezzolo Valle Uzzone, and Torre Bormida.

Demographic evolution

Comital title
The Bergolo estates were part of the minor aristocracy in the Italian nobility of relatively recent heritage (the comital title Count Calvi of Bergolo having been created in 1787). Members of the Calvi di Bergolo line include General Giorgio Carlo Calvi di Bèrgolo (1887–1977), consort of Princess Yolanda of Savoy, sister of Umberto II, the last king of Italy; Princess Mafalda of Savoy, wife of the Prince of Hesse, who died at Buchenwald concentration camp in 1944; and the painter Gregorio Calvi di Bergolo (1904–1994), who created the Hall of Murals in Chicago's International Surgical Museum.

References

External links 
 www.piemonteweb.it/Com/ComHome.asp?Com=666/
 Memorial to Ezra Pound in Bergolo Flickr photo album of the hillside monument erected to promote the American poet's vision for world peace after the events of 9/11
 12th century Romanesque St. Sebastian chapel and cemetery, Flickr photo album cemetery 
 Catalog of photographs of Bergolo on FlickrHiveMind 

Cities and towns in Piedmont